Anne Louise Hassing (born 17 September 1967) is a Danish actress. She is best known for her roles in the films Pain of Love (1992) and The Idiots (1998).

Career 

Anne Louise Hassing was born in Horsens, Denmark, on 17 September 1967. Hassing's acting career is known in Denmark for its remarkable start. In 1992, Hassing made her film debut in the lead role of Nils Malmros' Pain of Love (Danish: Kærlighedens Smerte). Malmros auditioned 362 actresses before choosing Hassing to play the role of an extremely emotional character named Kirsten, a manic-depressive student having an affair with her teacher. The role earned Hassing both the Robert and the Bodil awards for Best Actress. 

Afterward, Hassing worked for a short time as a bartender in Aarhus, Denmark. She was accepted into the Danish National School of Theater, which she attended from 1993 to 1997. Despite suffering from extreme stage fright, Hassing continued to pursue theater work. Her next notable role came five years later, after she graduated from the National School of Theater. In 1997, Hassing played the tender, uncomplicated character of Susanne in Lars Von Trier's Dogme film, The Idiots (Danish:Idioterne). Again, Hassing won a Bodil Award for her role, earning Best Supporting Actress of 1997. In an interview, Hassing spoke about working with Trier: 

Hassing has performed in the film adaptations of the Jane Aamund's novels Klinkevals and Juliane as well as the Danish TV series Strisser på Samsø (A Cop on Samsø) and De pokkers forældre. Hassing again received critical acclaim for her featured role as Ida in the popular Danish television drama Krøniken (English title: Better Times), for which she was awarded the Best Actress award in 2004, 2005, and 2006 at the annual Danish television awards, TvFestival.

Personal life 

Hassing married the Danish musician Peter Hellemann in 2006 after they had been a couple since 2001 and had a son in 2005. They divorced in 2017.

Hassing lives in Amager, Copenhagen. She practices Nichiren Buddhism with the Buddhist association Soka Gakkai International and credits the practice for relaxing her and relieving anxieties about her career and life.

Filmography

References

External links 
 
 Anne Louise Hassing at Den Danske Film Database (in Danish)
 Anne Louise Hassing at De Danske Filminstitut (in Danish)
 

1967 births
20th-century Danish actresses
21st-century Danish actresses
Best Actress Bodil Award winners
Best Actress Robert Award winners
Danish film actresses
Danish television actresses
Living people
Members of Sōka Gakkai
Nichiren Buddhists
People from Horsens